Hassan Farivar (born February 7, 1999) is an Iranian football midfielder, who last played for Iranian club Tractor Sazi in the Iran Pro League.

References

Living people
1999 births
Sportspeople from Tabriz
Association football midfielders
Iranian footballers
Tractor S.C. players
Iran under-20 international footballers
Pars Jonoubi Jam players